Mohammed Al Manea (Arabic: محمد المنيع; born 1 June 1930), Kuwaiti actor.

Early life
He began his acting career in 1963, He participated in several soap operas Kuwait.

Filmography

Cinema
bass ya bahar (1972)
la thaman lliwatan (1991)

Television
al firya (2006)

References

External links 
 Mohammed Al Manea (Arabic)

1930 births
Living people
Kuwaiti male television actors